Alexander Abercromby may refer to:

Sir Alexander Abercromby, 1st Baronet (c. 1603–1684), Scottish politician, Commissioner for Banffshire 1640–1641, 1643, 1646–1648 and 1661–1663
Alexander Abercromby (Scottish politician) (1678–1728), Scottish politician, MP for Banffshire 1706–1727
Alexander Abercromby, Lord Abercromby (1745–1795), Scottish advocate, judge and essayist
Alexander Abercromby (British Army officer) (1784–1853), Scottish army officer and politician, MP for Clackmannanshire

See also
Abercromby (surname)